Gråhøe is a mountain in Dovre Municipality in Innlandet county, Norway. The mountain is surrounded by several other notable mountains including Falketind and Blåberget to the northwest, Halvfarhøe to the west, and Storhøe and Fokstuguhøi to the southwest.

See also
List of mountains of Norway

References

Dovre
Mountains of Innlandet